Assefa may refer to:

Alemseged Assefa, Ethiopian banker
Alexander Assefa, American politician
Samuel Assefa, Ethiopian academic and diplomat
Sofia Assefa (born 1987), Ethiopian long-distance runner
Tigist Assefa (born 1994), Ethiopian long-distance runner
Meskerem Assefa (born 1985), Ethiopian runner
Assefa Mezgebu (born 1978), Ethiopian long-distance runner

Amharic-language names